From March 6 to 7, 2023, operators of traditional public jeepneys and minivans held strikes in various cities across the Philippines to protest against the Public Utility Vehicle Modernization Program. The strikes were originally planned to last a week, until March 12, but the organizations leading the strike declared an end to it on March 7, following a meeting with the Presidential Communications Office at the Malacañang Palace.

Strike organizers later revealed that the administration had agreed to delay the implementation of the program to December 31, 2023, and to use the intervening months to review all the aspects of the program implementation, taking the concerns of drivers and operators into account.

Background

Organizers of the strike are protesting against the Philippine government's Public Utility Vehicle Modernization Program, which intends to phase out dilapidated and old or traditional jeepneys and utility vans meant for public transport. Traditional jeepneys are a legacy of World War II, with designs not changing much apart from the addition of secondhand engines from Japanese manufacturers. There was no mandatory retirement age for commercial vehicles in the Philippines.

The modernization program was launched in 2017 and is mainly implemented by the Department of Transportation (DOTr) and the Land Transportation Franchising and Regulatory Board (LTFRB). It is aimed to replace public utility vehicles (PUVs), including jeepneys and buses that are at least 15 years old with newer models that are more eco-friendly within the next three years. Though reportedly in practice, this covered all traditional jeepneys.

The government also has urged operators to form cooperatives for them to have a better borrowing capacity but critics said that this is still insufficient. This proposal was made through LTFRB's memorandum circular 2023-013, which also imposes the suspension of provisional authority for operators who would fail to comply.

Participants
The strike is led by Manibela, a group of public transport group that claims to represent 40,000 drivers. They are aiming to halt the planned phaseout of PUVs originally set on June 30, 2023. They are joined by the United Transport Federation and Laban TNVS (under the No to PUV Phaseout Coalition), and are supported by commuter group PARA - Advocates for Inclusive Transport.

The LTFRB on their part says they are not pressured, claiming that 90 percent of transport groups support the modernization program. The Metropolitan Manila Development Authority (MMDA) claims that eight groups will not participate: Pinagkaisang Samahan ng mga Tsuper at Operators Nationwide (Piston), Federation of Jeepney Operators and Drivers Association of the Philippines (Fejodap), UV Express group, Association of Concerned Transport Organizations (Acto), Pasang Masda, Liga ng Transportasyon at Operators sa Pilipinas (LTOP), Alliance of Transport Operators and Drivers Association of the Philippines (Altodap), and Northern Mindanao Federation of Transport Service Cooperative (Nomfedtrasco). Piston later decided to join.

Locations
Bicol Region
Calabarzon
Central Luzon
Metro Manila
Cagayan de Oro

Goals
Organizers urged for the cancellation of LTFRB memorandum circular 2023-013, which mandates operators to join a cooperative before they could engage with the LTFRB for dialogue.

Strike

March 6
The Bagong Alyansang Makabayan was allowed to organize protests at Mendiola, Manila in parallel and support of the transport strike by the Manila Police District.

The government has downplayed the impact of the strike. The Metropolitan Manila Development Authority claims that the strike failed to paralyze commuters in Metro Manila. According to Piston, the majority of jeepneys and UV Express services along nine locales in Metro Manila and Calabarzon had ceased operations to participate in the strike.

Affected inter routes include:

Routes between the city of Antipolo and municipality of Taytay
Routes between Cogeo in the city of Antipolo and Cubao in Quezon City
Routes between Novaliches in Quezon City, and F. Blumentritt Road in Santa Cruz, Manila
Routes between Pala-pala Road in Dasmariñas and the city of Imus
Routes between the municipality of Los Baños and the city of Calamba

Affected intra routes include:

Routes within the city of Pasay, particularly in Baclaran
Routes within the city of Calamba
Routes within the city of Cabuyao

However, according to the LTFRB, only 10 percent of routes in Metro Manila and 5 percent of routes nationwide were affected by the strike, asserting that these gaps were addressed by the free rides provided by the government.

Although Manibela and Piston considered the first day of the strike as a success owing to the fact that a lot of would be commuters, including students who attended classes which were held online in anticipation of the protest action, decided to not go out to the streets

March 7
Manibela and Piston continued their strike on March 7, vowing to continue until the modernization program is completely put to a halt.

Response

National government
President Bongbong Marcos urged transport groups to reconsider the planned strikes, appealing to their potential impact on commuters. He said that the modernization program is a must but expressed apprehension about the program's immediate implementation. He acknowledged the need to engage in dialogue to tweak the program's implementation to reduce the financial burden of the operators. He has proposed alternatives to its implementation such as allowing old utility vehicles that passes an inspection to continue operating. The LFTRB would move the deadline of phaseout from June 30, 2023, to December 31, 2023.

The Department of Education (DepEd) announced that there would be no suspension of classes but said that those who are not able to attend physically should be allowed to "continue to learn through Alternative Delivery Modes". Select universities in Metro Manila has announced a shift to online classes for the duration of the strike.

Local governments
All mayors of localities of Metro Manila and the MMDA have pledged to provide free rides to commuters that would be affected by the planned strike.

Aftermath
On March 7, 2023, following a meeting with the Presidential Communications Office at the Malacañang Palace, PISTON and Manibela declared an end of the strike. They announced resumption of regular operations for its drivers starting the following day.

Manibela chairperson Mar Valbuena later revealed on the evening of March 7 that the administration had agreed to delay the implementation of the program to December 31, 2023, and to use the intervening months to review all the aspects of the program implementation, taking the concerns of drivers, operators, and other stakeholders into account.

Notes

See also
2017–2019 transport strikes in the Philippines
Protests against Bongbong Marcos

References

2023 labor disputes and strikes
March 2023 events in the Philippines
Labor disputes in the Philippines
Protests in the Philippines
Transportation in the Philippines
Bongbong Marcos administration controversies
Jeepneys
Scheduled events